Vladimir Malinovsky (Владимир Малиновский, born June 9, 1991) is a Russian ice hockey player. He is currently playing with Metallurg Magnitogorsk of the Kontinental Hockey League (KHL).

Malinovsky made his Kontinental Hockey League (KHL) debut playing with Metallurg Magnitogorsk during the 2012–13 KHL season.

References

External links

1991 births
Living people
Metallurg Magnitogorsk players
Russian ice hockey right wingers
Zauralie Kurgan players